The Federation of Bangladeshi Associations in North America (FOBANA), is one of the oldest Bangladeshi organizations in North America. Established in 1987, the organization's primary goal is to organize annual conventions across the country hosted by various member Bangladeshi associations.

The organization is registered in Washington, D.C., and received its 501(c)(3) status in 2007.

History
The Federation of Bangladeshi Associations in North America was formed in 1987 as an umbrella organization for the numerous Bangladeshi associations in the United States and Canada. As of 2021, it consisted of "almost 75 member organizations".

Activities
FOBANA organizes an annual convention hosted by one or more FOBANA member organizations.  The convention is award at the annual general meeting two years in advance so that the host organization has enough time to prepare for the convention successfully.

The first FOBANA convention was held in Washington, D.C. in 1987. Since then, the annual convention has become the organization's flagship event. It is held over the Labor Day weekend in a different North American city each year. Although the organization claims to be non-political, in 1994, 1995, and 1996, political factions of FOBANA staged parallel conventions. Competing factions again held separate conventions in 2008.

Political scientist Ahrar Ahmad describes the convention as "a particularly glittering affair", which attracts thousands of attendees. There are cultural performances by leading entertainers from Bangladesh, speakers and discussions on Bangladeshi topics, and vendors of various Bengali products.
Participants come to renew acquaintances, enjoy a feeling of community, and expose their children to their ancestral homeland's culture. According to sociologist Habibul Haque Khondker, "many Bangladeshi professionals also attend such events to display their high professional and class status."

Leadership

FOBANA organization is run by the elected executive committee, which consists of five (5) elected executive team members, Nine (9) outstanding members and thirteen (17) executive member organizations.  The executive team consists of a Chairperson, Vice-Chairperson, Executive Secretary, Joint Executive Secretary and Treasurer.  These elected members resolves organizational issues through regular monthly meetings.

In 2009, FOBANA formed a special standing committees to effectively execute and expand the social, cultural and economic activities related to Bangladeshis living in North America.  Currently there are twenty-five standing committees supporting all organizational and social/cultural affairs.

References

External links
 Official FOBANA Web site
 Trademark information in USPTO database

Diaspora organizations in the United States
Bangladeshi-American culture
Bangladeshi-Canadian culture
Charities based in Washington, D.C.
Overseas Bangladeshi organisations